Developmental Science is a peer-reviewed scientific journal covering developmental psychology and developmental cognitive neuroscience that was established in 1998. The current editors are Charles A. Nelson, Michelle de Haan, and Paul C. Quinn.

Topics covered include:
 Clinical, computational, and comparative approaches to development
 Cognitive and social development
 Functional neuroimaging of the developing brain
 Developmental disorders

According to the Journal Citation Reports, the journal has a 2014 impact factor of 3.808.

References

External links 
 

Publications established in 1998
Wiley-Blackwell academic journals
English-language journals
Bimonthly journals
Developmental psychology journals

zh:经济学刊